Radio Klasik is a national Malay language-radio station operated by Radio Televisyen Malaysia. It was formerly known as Original Malay Melody Radio in 1998, Klasik FM in 2005 and Klasik Nasional FM in 2006.

History
Radio Klasik's predecessor, Original Malay Melody Radio (RIMA) was launched on 11 April 1998 in conjunction with RTM's 52nd anniversary due to lack of radio station which airs original Malay songs. It was renamed as Klasik FM on 1 April 2005 as part of RTM's radio station rebranding. On 12 August 2006, Klasik FM merged with Nasional FM to form Klasik Nasional FM and broadcast classical Malay music together with its main program 24 hours a day.

However, the merger survived for only five years, as the station began losing listeners to sister stations and private competitors such as Hot FM, Sinar FM and Era FM, as well as then-upstart Bernama's Radio24 which took over the frequencies of Klasik FM. Thus, Klasik Nasional was demerged on 1 January 2012 at midnight and split into the original two radio stations, with Nasional FM using the same frequencies as the former Muzik FM (discontinued in late 2012) and Klasik Nasional became Radio Klasik.

Frequency

Radio

Television

References

External links 
 

Radio stations in Malaysia
Malay-language radio stations
Mass media in Kuala Lumpur
Radio Televisyen Malaysia